For the late former Paraguayan President, see Luis Alberto Riart

Luis Alberto Riart  was the Paraguayan Minister of Education and Culture under President Fernando Lugo.

References

Living people
Government ministers of Paraguay
Year of birth missing (living people)
Place of birth missing (living people)